Jules Buckley (born 8 January 1980) is an English conductor, composer, and arranger.

Personal
Buckley was born and grew up in Aylesbury, Buckinghamshire in the UK. He is the son of Keith Buckley (a doctor) and Joan Buckley, and attended Aylesbury Grammar School. Buckley started playing the trumpet aged 9 at the Aylesbury Music Centre. He played in the Aylesbury Music Centre Dance Band and went on to study trumpet at the Guildhall School of Music in London before changing to classical composition. His initial ambition was to be a jazz trumpeter, but at the Guildhall School his interests grew to include musical composition and conducting. He now lives in Berlin, Germany.

Career
In 2004, Buckley and producer/manager Chris Wheeler co-founded the Heritage Orchestra, with the intention of featuring an orchestra in a music club setting. In 2008, Buckley became principal guest conductor of the Metropole Orkest, a jazz and eclectic music orchestra based in Hilversum, and chief conductor from 2013. In 2020, he became Creative Artist-in-Residence with the BBC Symphony Orchestra and stood in as presenter of the BBC Radio 3 programme Classical Fix, in place of Clemency Burton-Hill, who suffered a brain haemorrhage in January 2020.

Collaborations
Buckley has worked with the WDR Big Band; José James and the Royal Concertgebouw Orchestra; Patrick Watson and the Orchestre National d'Île de France; and arranged and conducted Caro Emerald's album The Shocking Miss Emerald and Jacob Collier's album Djesse Vol. 1. Other collaborations have included projects with Gregory Porter; Tori Amos; Markus Stockhausen; Michael Kiwanuka; Jonathan Jeremiah; Basement Jaxx; Massive Attack; Arctic Monkeys; John Cale; Paul Weller; Emeli Sandé; The Cinematic Orchestra; Jamie Cullum; Beardyman; Cory Henry ; Snarky Puppy;  Becca Stevens; Andrea Motis and Dizzee Rascal.

Awards
In February 2016, the Snarky Puppy album Sylva, featuring Buckley and the Metropole Orkest, won a Grammy Award for Best Contemporary Instrumental Album. At the end of 2016, Classic House with Pete Tong and the Heritage Orchestra reached No. 1 in the Album Charts. In 2020, the song "All night long" by Jacob Collier, featuring Take 6 and the Metropole Orkest, won an award for the "Best arrangement, instrumental and vocal" at the 62nd Grammy Awards.

In 2018, Buckley and Metropole Orkest were awarded the Bremer Musikfest-Preis in special recognition of their contribution to the success of Musikfest Bremen.

Notable recent performances

August 2016: BBC Prom 49 with the Metropole Orkest, celebrating the music of Quincy Jones.

February 2017: conducted the National Symphony Orchestra with Snarky Puppy at the Kennedy Center, Washington DC.

August 2018: Returned to the BBC Proms with the Heritage Orchestra for a late-night Prom "New York Now", celebrating the changing soundscape of New York and featuring artists from that city, including Hercules and Love Affair.

June 2019: "Soundtrack of the 80s with Quincy Jones" with the Metropole Orkest at London's O2 arena.

August 2019: BBC Prom 45 with the Metropole Orkest in a homage to Nina Simone, with Ledisi and Lisa Fischer to a packed Royal Albert Hall.

September 2019: BBC Prom 64 with the Heritage Orchestra and Soul Mavericks, featuring Terra & Eddie, Sunni and Lagaet, at the Royal Albert Hall.

February 2020: Seattle Symphony Orchestra, "The Best of Quincy Jones", at Benaroya Hall, Seattle.

February 2020: BBC Symphony Orchestra, featuring Lianne La Havas, at the Barbican Hall, London.

August 2021: The Proms, BBC Symphony Orchestra, featuring Moses Sumney.

Discography

References

External links
 Metropole Orkest page on Jules Buckley
 Information about Jules Buckley on Serious News
 Homepage of the Heritage Orchestra
 A.P. Childs, 'Orchestra man and popster Jules Buckley on Holland’s Cross-Linx festival & more'.  Art Rocker, 15 April 2015

English composers
1980 births
Living people
English conductors (music)
British male conductors (music)
Alumni of the Guildhall School of Music and Drama
Grammy Award winners
21st-century British conductors (music)
21st-century British male musicians
People educated at Aylesbury Grammar School